The Office of Congressional Affairs (OCA) serves as the liaison between the United States Central Intelligence Agency (CIA) and the US Congress. OCA aims to ensures that Congress is fully and currently informed of intelligence activities.

The office is the CIA's primary interface with Congressional oversight committees, leadership, and members. It is responsible for all matters pertaining to congressional interaction and oversight of US intelligence activities. It aims to:

 ensure that Congress is kept informed of intelligence issues and activities by providing timely briefings and notifications
 facilitate prompt and complete responses to congressional requests for information and inquiries
 maintaining a record of the Agency's interaction with Congress
 track legislation that could affect the Agency
 educate Agency personnel about their responsibility to keep Congress fully and currently informed

References

Central Intelligence Agency